Moechohecyra is a genus of longhorn beetles of the subfamily Lamiinae.

 Moechohecyra arctifera Wang & Chiang, 2002
 Moechohecyra indica Breuning, 1938
 Moechohecyra sumatrana Breuning, 1956
 Moechohecyra verrucicollis (Gahan, 1895)

References

Crossotini